The World Tag League may refer to any of the following professional wrestling tournaments held in Japan:

 World Tag League (JWA), 1970 to 1972, hosted by Japanese Wrestling Association
 World Tag League (NJPW), annually since 1991, hosted by New Japan Pro Wrestling
 World's Strongest Tag Determination League, annually since 1977, hosted by All Japan Pro Wrestling

See also
 Puroresu